The University of Medicine, Magway located in Magway, is one of five universities of medicine in Myanmar. The university offers an M.B., B.S. degree program, and master's degree programs in medical science.

Up to 2011 December, the Ministry of Health-administered university was one of the most selective in the country, and accepts each year approximately 600 undergraduate students outside of Yangon Region and Mandalay Region based on their University Entrance Examination scores.

As it was the only university of medicine in the country that accepts students from the rest of the country, the university was reputed to have the most economically, culturally and ethnically diverse student population as the Union University,  among all Burmese universities of medicine. But, when educational reforms are started under the New Regime, the numbers of fresher candidates is reduced to 99 (2012 December) and those fresher students are from Magway Region, Shan State(East), Rakhine State, Bago Region (West). The fresher students from Lower Myanmar are relocated to University of Medicine 2, Yangon, and those from Kachin State, Chin State and Sagaing Region are to University of Medicine Mandalay.

University of Medicine, Magway, is one of five schools in Myanmar recognized by the Educational Commission for Foreign Medical Graduates.

Leadership 
The university has been headed by an academic dean known as a rector. Past rectors include:
 Than Myint (April 2001–March 2006)
 Maung Maung Win (April 2006–August 2010)
 Win Myat Aye (February 2011–May 2014)
 Aye Tun (June 2014–January 2017)
 Khin Zaw (March 2017–July 2018)
 Htay Hla (February 2019–July 2020)
 Aye Aye Oo (April 2021–Present)

Undergraduate curriculum

First Year M.B., B.S.
Myanmar Literature
English
Mathematics & statistics
Physics
Chemistry
Botany
Zoology

Second Year M.B., B.S.
 Anatomy
 Biochemistry
 Physiology

Third Year M.B., B.S.
 General Pathology
 Microbiology
 Pharmacology
Students are also posted for 18 weeks each to the medical and surgical wards for clinical training.

Final Part One M.B., B.S.
 Systemic Pathology
 Preventive and Social Medicine
 Forensic Medicine

Final Part Two M.B., B.S.
Medicine
Surgery
Obstetrics and Gynaecology
Pediatrics

Internship
Medical Ward
Surgery Ward (Including Orthopedic and Operation Theater)
O and G Ward
Pediatric Ward
Field Research Department
All the government hospitals in Myanmar which have at least 4 specialties centers can be regarded as a field place for interns.

House officer training
All students, after a successful completion of Final Part II examination, are required to continue with hands-on training for a period of one year as house surgeons in state-recognized teaching hospitals in Yangon and/ r the State and Division Hospitals. Training periods are:

House Officers must take their training in one of the teaching hospitals in the following cities:
Magway မကွေး
Minbu မင်းဘူး
Naypyitaw နေပြည်တော်

The House Officers can apply, if they wished, for the transfer to Yangon and Mandalay Hospitals after one ward completion in Training Hospitals under University of Medicine, Magway.

Core contents
At the end of the 1st MB course, the student should be able to: 
 Define and understand ethics, medical ethics, Hippocratic Oath, Declaration of Geneva in Burmese and English versions 
 Be aware of ethical and moral issues in relation to Burmese culture
At the end of the 2nd MB course, the student should be able to: 
 Choose correct statement regarding respect of dead body and specimen.
 Choose correct statement regarding research ethics
 Choose correct statement regarding informed consent
At the end of the 3rd MB course, the student should be able to:
 Be aware of biomedical ethics
 Safely handle infectious agents 
 Describe rational prescribing (NNT, RRR, APR) 
 Prescribe safely
 Conduct appropriate bedside manner 
 Identify health care errors and their causes
 At the end of the FP I course, the student should be able to describe: 
 Code of conduct (medical/ethical)
 Serious medical misconduct
 Medical negligence (civil and criminal)
 Formation and function of MMC
 Professionalism
 Patient safety concepts
 How to take consent for post-mortem examination
 Public health ethics and their importance
 Communication skills concerning specimen collection
 Ethical principle of respect for the death
 After the end of the Final Part II, the students should be able to:
 Demonstrate effective and ethical communications skills in patient management
 Be aware of patient safety concepts & ethical principles in clinical management decision making and ethical dilemmas
 After the end of the internship, the candidates should be able to:
 Apply patient safety concepts and ethical principles in clinical management decision making and ethical dilemmas

Graduate curriculum
The university offers master's degree programs in Anatomy, Physiology, Biochemistry, Microbiology, Pharmacology, Pathology, Medicine, Surgery, Obstetrics and Gynaecology, and Pediatrics.

Teaching hospitals

Magway Regional Hospital
Minbu District Hospital
Magway Teaching Hospital

See also
 List of universities in Myanmar
 Medical Universities (Myanmar)

References

External links 

 National Health Plan (2006–2011), Ministry of Health, Human Resources for Health Development Project, pg 252.
 Official University website
 
 List of Universities registered under WHO
 WHO/SEARO special support to health institutions in Myanmar

Universities and colleges in Magway Region
Medical schools in Myanmar
Educational institutions established in 2000
2000 establishments in Myanmar